KDLC may refer to:

 KDLC (FM), a radio station (97.7 FM) licensed to serve Dulac, Louisiana, United States
 Dillon County Airport (ICAO code KDLC)